Beat is 1997 South Korean action film directed by Kim Sung-su and written by Sam Shin about a high school dropout who is forced into gang life. Jung Woo-sung played the lead Min and Ko So-young his love interest Romy. The plot is based on a bestselling graphic novel by Huh Young-man.

The role solidified Jung as a leading Korean actor and was also based on his real-life experience as a high school dropout. This was the third and final film pairing Jung and Ko, but the director would later work with Jung again in Musa (2001).

Plot
Three friends in Korea all drop out of high school. Min is a feared brawler whose widowed mother is a drunk. The story traces his journey from high school to the underworld as his best friend introduces him to life in the mob. Complicating Min's life further is his love for the volatile Romy, a girl from an upper-class family with dreams of going to a prestigious college.

Cast
 Jung Woo-sung ... Min
 Ko So-young ... Romy
 Yoo Oh-sung ... Tae-soo
 Im Chang-jung ... Hwan-gyu
Sa Hyeon-jin
Song Geum-sig
Jang Dong-jik
Shin Burm-sik
Kim Boo-seon ... Madam Shin
Lee In-ock
 Lee Moon-sik ... Ward Office staff

References

External links 
 
 

1997 films
1990s crime action films
1990s teen films
South Korean crime action films
South Korean teen films
Films about organized crime in South Korea
Films based on manhwa
Films based on works by Huh Young-man
1990s Korean-language films
Live-action films based on comics